The Bulloo Developmental Road is an outback road in Queensland, Australia. It is part of the Adventure Way, a route from Brisbane to Adelaide via the Australian outback.

Updates

Widen and seal
A project to widen and seal sections of the road, at a cost of $4.5 million, was due to commence in October 2021.

Locations on the route
From east to west:
 Cunnamulla (
 Eulo
 Lake Bindegolly National Park in Dynevor
 Thargomindah

Major intersections

References

See also
Vincent James Dowling

Highways in Queensland
South West Queensland